The fifteen Katuic languages form a branch of the Austroasiatic languages spoken by about 1.3 million people in Southeast Asia. People who speak Katuic languages are called the Katuic peoples. Paul Sidwell is the leading specialist on the Katuic languages. He notes that Austroasiatic/Mon–Khmer languages are lexically more similar to Katuic and Bahnaric the closer they are geographically. He says this geographic similarity is independent of which branch of the family each language belongs to. He also says Katuic and Bahnaric do not have any shared innovations, so they do not form a single branch of the Austroasiatic family, but form separate branches.

Classification
In 1966, a lexicostatistical analysis of various Austroasiatic languages in Mainland Southeast Asia was performed by Summer Institute of Linguistics linguists David Thomas and Richard Phillips. This study resulted in the recognition of two distinct new subbranches of Austroasiatic, namely Katuic and Bahnaric (Sidwell 2009). Sidwell (2005) casts doubt on Diffloth's Vieto-Katuic hypothesis, saying that the evidence is ambiguous, and that it is not clear where Katuic belongs in the family. Sufficient data for use in the sub-classification of the Katuic languages only become available after the opening of Laos to foreign researchers in the 1990s.

Sidwell (2005)
The sub-classification of Katuic below was proposed by Sidwell (2005). Additionally, Sidwell (2009) analyzes the Katu branch as the most conservative subgroup of Katuic.

West Katuic branch:
Kuy languages:
Kuy, Souei
Bru languages:
Bru, So, etc.
Ta'Oi branch:
Ta'Oi, Katang, Talan/Ong/Ir/Inh
Kriang/Ngeq
Katu branch:
Katu, Phuong, Kantu, Triw, Dak Kang
Pacoh branch:
Pacoh

Gehrmann (2019)
Gehrmann (2019) proposes the following classification of the Katuic languages.
Proto-Katuic
Proto-West Katuic
Kuay languages
Bru languages
Proto-Pacoh-Ta'oi
Ta'oi languages
Pacoh languages
Kriang languages
Katu languages

Ethnologue also lists Kassang (the Tariang language), but that is a Bahnaric language (Sidwell 2003). Lê, et al. (2014:294) reports a Katu subgroup called Ba-hi living in mountainous areas of Phong Điền District, Vietnam, but Watson (1996:197) speaks of "Pacoh Pahi" as a Pacoh variety.

Kuy and Bru each have around half a million speakers, while the Ta’Oi cluster has around 200,000 speakers.

Proto-language
Reconstructions of Proto-Katuic, or its sub-branches, include:
Thomas (1967): A Phonology Reconstruction of Proto-East-Katuic
Diffloth (1982): Registres, devoisement, timbres vocaliques: leur histoire en katouique
Efinov (1983): Problemy fonologicheskoj rekonstrukcii proto-katuicheskogo jazyka
Peiros (1996): Katuic Comparative Dictionary
Therapahan L-Thongkum (2001): Languages of the Tribes in Xekong Province, Southern Laos
Paul Sidwell (2005): The Katuic languages: classification, reconstruction and comparative lexicon

Sidwell (2005) reconstructs the consonant inventory of proto-Katuic as follows:

Lexical isoglosses
Paul Sidwell (2015:185-186) lists the following lexical innovations unique to Katuic that had replaced original Proto-Austroasiatic forms.

Sidwell (2015:173) lists the following lexical isoglosses shared between Katuic and Bahnaric.

Furthermore, Gerard Diffloth (1992) lists the words 'centipede', 'bone', 'to cough', 'to fart', 'to breathe', and 'blood' as isoglosses shared between Katuic and Vietic. A Vieto-Katuic connection has also been proposed by Alves (2005).

See also
List of Proto-Katuic  reconstructions (Wiktionary)

Further reading
Gehrmann, Ryan. 2018. Katuic presyllables and derivational morphology in diachronic perspective. In Ring, Hiram & Felix Rau (eds.), Papers from the Seventh International Conference on Austroasiatic Linguistics, 132–156. Journal of the Southeast Asian Linguistics Society Special Publication No. 3. Honolulu: University of Hawai’i Press.
Gehrmann, Ryan. 2017. The Historical Phonology of Kriang, A Katuic Language. Journal of the Southeast Asian Linguistics Society 10.1, 114–139.
Gehrmann, Ryan. 2016. The West Katuic languages: comparative phonology and diagnostic tools. Chiang Mai: Payap University MA Thesis.
Gehrmann, Ryan. 2015. Vowel Height and Register Assignment in Katuic. Journal of the Southeast Asian Linguistics Society 8. 56–70.
Gehrmann, Ryan and Johanna Conver. 2015. Katuic Phonological Features. Mon-Khmer Studies 44. 55–67.
Choo, Marcus. 2012. The Status of Katuic. Chiang Mai: Linguistics Institute, Payap University.
Choo, Marcus. 2010.  Katuic Bibliography with Selected Annotations. Chiang Mai: Linguistics Institute, Payap University.
Choo, Marcus. 2009. Katuic Bibliography. Chiang Mai: Linguistics Institute, Payap University.
Sidwell, Paul. 2005. The Katuic languages: classification, reconstruction and comparative lexicon. LINCOM studies in Asian linguistics 58. Munich: LINCOM Europa. 
Sidwell, Paul. 2005. Proto-Katuic phonology and the sub-grouping of Mon-Khmer languages. In Paul Sidwell (ed.), SEALSXV: Papers from the 15th Meeting of the South East Asian Linguistics Society, 193–204. Pacific Linguistics PL E1. Canberra: Pacific Linguistics.
Theraphan L-Thongkum. 2002. The Role of endangered Mon-Khmer languages of Xekong Province, Southern Laos, in the reconstruction of Proto-Katuic. In Marlys Macken (ed.), Papers from the Tenth Annual Meeting of the Southeast Asian Linguistics Society. 407–429. Program for Southeast Asian Studies, Arizona State University.
Theraphan L-Thongkum. 2001. ภาษาของนานาชนเผ่าในแขวงเซกองลาวใต้. Phasa khong nanachon phaw nai khweng Sekong Lao Tai. [Languages of the tribes in Xekong province, Southern Laos]. Bangkok: The Thailand Research Fund.
Peiros, Ilia. 1996. Katuic comparative dictionary. Pacific Linguistics C-132. Canberra: Australian National University. 
Miller, John & Carolyn Miller. 1996. Lexical comparison of Katuic Mon-Khmer languages with special focus on So-Bru groups in Northeast Thailand. Mon-Khmer Studies 26. 255–290.
Migliazza, Brian. 1992. Lexicostatistic analysis of some Katuic languages. In Amara Prasithrathsint & Sudaporn Luksaneeyanawin (eds.), 3rd International Symposium on Language and Linguistics, 1320–1325. Bangkok: Chulalongkorn University.
Gainey, Jerry. 1985. A comparative study of Kui, Bruu and So phonology from a genetic point of view. Bangkok: Chulalongkorn University MA thesis.
Effimov, Aleksandr. 1983. Проблемы фонологической реконструкции прото-катуического языка. Probljemy phonologichjeskoj rjekonstruktsii Proto-Katuichjeskovo jazyka. [Issues in the phonological reconstruction of the Proto-Katuic language]. Moscow: Institute of Far Eastern studies Moscow dissertation.
Diffloth, Gérard. 1982. Registres, dévoisement, timbres vocaliques: leur histoire en Katouique. [Registers, devoicing, vowel phonation: their history in Katuic]. Mon-Khmer Studies 11. 47–82.
Thomas, Dorothy. M. (1967). A phonological reconstruction of Proto–East Katuic. Grand Forks: University of North Dakota MA thesis.

References

 Sidwell, Paul. (2005). The Katuic languages: classification, reconstruction and comparative lexicon. LINCOM studies in Asian linguistics, 58. Muenchen: Lincom Europa. 
 Sidwell, Paul. (2009). Classifying the Austroasiatic languages: history and state of the art. LINCOM studies in Asian linguistics, 76. Munich: Lincom Europa.

External links
Frank Huffman Katuic Audio Archives
Paul Sidwell (2003)
http://projekt.ht.lu.se/rwaai RWAAI (Repository and Workspace for Austroasiatic Intangible Heritage)
http://hdl.handle.net/10050/00-0000-0000-0003-6712-F@view Katuic languages in RWAAI Digital Archive

 
Languages of Laos
Languages of Thailand
Languages of Vietnam